Rushen, formally Kirk Christ Rushen, is one of the seventeen historic parishes of the Isle of Man.

It is located in the south of the island (part of the traditional South Side division) in the sheading of the same name.

Administratively, part of the historic parish of Rushen, and the majority of the population, is now covered by the village districts of Port Erin and Port St Mary. As a result, there is an exclave of the parish district which includes the Calf of Man.

Other settlements in the parish include Cregneash.

Local government
For the purposes of local government, the majority of the area of the historic parish formed a single parish district, with Commissioners, but this has now been amalgamated with Arbory. (See Arbory and Rushen.)

Since the 1880s, two areas of the historic parish of Rushen have been the two separate village districts of Port Erin and Port St Mary, each with its own village commissioners.

The Captain of the Parish (since 1998) is Stanley Ditchfield Clucas.

Politics
Rushen parish is split between two House of Keys constituencies: Rushen, covering the majority of the parish including Port Erin and Port St Mary, and the Arbory, Castletown & Malew constituency, which covers the eastern part of the historic parish. Each constituency elects two Members to the House of Keys. Before 2016 the whole parish was in the Rushen constituency.

Geography
The principal headlands are Kallow Point, Black Head, Spanish Head, and Bradda Head; and the chief inlets are Port St Mary Bay, Perwick Bay, Bay Stacka, Port Erin Bay, and Fleshwick Bay.

The west of the parish is hilly, stretching southwards from Cronk ny Irrey Laa (the highest point in the parish) along the western coast to Lhiattee ny Beinnee, Bradda Hill, Mull Hill, and the Sound, across which the ridge is continued on the Calf.

Port St Mary and Port Erin are the only significant settlements in the area, although they have now expanded to form a single continuous settlement. Cregneash is a small village and folk museum near Mull Hill.

Demographics
The Isle of Man census of 2016 returned a parish population of 1,537, a decrease of 6% from the figure of 1,629 in 2011. At the time of the 2011 census, 2.64% of the parish could speak Manx Gaelic.

Rushen Internment Camp in World War Two 
Rushen was taken over as a detention camp for more than 3,500 women and children during World War Two. Deemed "enemy aliens" many of the internees were refugees who had already fled persecution in Europe. It was the only civilian camp on the island and many of the detained were billeted with local families as well as in requisitioned boarding houses. Rushen Camp opened on 30 May 1940 and closed in September 1945. (The male detainees were held in Douglas.)

References

External links
 Manxnotebook - Rushen with full description of the parish 
 Isle of Man Building Control Districts showing parish boundaries
 Great.Outdoors.com/ManxGlens Glenology - Manx Glens An ongoing study of Manx glens, their locations and meanings.
Rushen Parish Commissioners
GeoHive Census Information
Constituency maps and general election results

Parishes of the Isle of Man
Constituencies of the Isle of Man